The 1907–08 Scottish Districts season is a record of all the rugby union matches for Scotland's district teams.

History

Glasgow District and Edinburgh District drew nil-nil in the Inter-City match for the second year in a row.

The SRU founded a new match this year. Instead of the Anglo-Scots playing South of Scotland, the Anglo-Scots were to play against a 'Provinces' District. To represent the Provinces, players were selected from clubs outwith Glasgow and Edinburgh. As such they were deemed provincial. The Provinces District was the counterpart to the very occasional Glasgow-Edinburgh (or 'Cities') representative side.

The 1907-8 trials are as follows: "November 16— South-West v North of Scotland, in the south-west. November 30 South v. North and South-West (combined), in the south. December 7 — Glasgow v. Edinburgh, at Glasgow. December 21 — Provinces v. Anglo-Scots, at Inverleith. January 11 — Cities v Rest of Scotland, at Inverleith. Feb 29 Glasgow v. Edinburgh, at Glasgow.

Results

Inter-City

Glasgow District:

Edinburgh District:

Other Scottish matches

South-West:

North of Scotland District: 

Provinces:

Anglo-Scots: 

Cities:

Provinces:

English matches

No other District matches played.

International matches

No touring matches this season.

References

1907–08 in Scottish rugby union
Scottish Districts seasons